Solo Man is the debut studio album by Victor Willis, original lead singer of the disco group Village People. It was released on August 21, 2015, 36 years after it was recorded.  The album is a mixture of traditional R&B, gospel and soul styles.

Background
After five hit albums with Village People, Willis left the group in 1979 to record a solo album.  The group's label at the time, Casablanca Records, anticipated releasing the album and announced it to the media. After Willis' departure, Village People album sales plummeted causing Casablanca to drop the band from the label.  Willis was still under contract with the Village People production company and the album was caught up in the turmoil.

In 1981, rights to the solo album were returned to Willis but soon after, the master tapes went missing.  The tapes were finally located in 2007.

For most of the tracks, Willis utilized the Village People band Gypsy Lane with rhythm arrangements by Horace Ott.  For the remaining tracks, top studio musicians were assembled under the direction of Ray Chew.

As of 2019, this album is currently unavailable, physically or digitally.

Track listing
All tracks written by Victor Willis
 "Come Go With Me"  – 5:18
 "I Struck It Rich"  – 5:37
 "Come Back To America"  – 5:08
 "Follow Through"  – 5:53
 "Krazy Bout Your Love"  – 4:43
 "Could It Be"  – 5:02
 "Body Wants To Be Loved"  – 5:54
 "Yes I Can"  – 5:14
 "Solo Man"  – 5:38

Personnel
Tracks 3, 4, 5, 7, 8, 9
Russell Dabney – drums
Alfonso Carey – bass
Jimmy Lee – guitar
Rodger Lee – rhythm guitar
Nathaniel Wilkie – keyboards
Richard Trifan – synthesizer
Lawrence Killian – percussion
Horace Ott – strings, horns and rhythm arrangements

Tracks 1, 2, 6
Chris Parker – drums
Marcus Miller – bass
Jeff Mironov – guitar
Rodger Lee – rhythm guitar
Ray Chew – keyboards
Errol "Crusher" Bennett – percussion

References

1979 albums
Victor Willis albums
Songs written by Victor Willis
Albums arranged by Horace Ott